The Lamar Buffalo Ranch is a historic livestock ranch in the Lamar River valley of Yellowstone National Park, in the U.S. state of Wyoming. As an early contribution to the conservation of bison, it was created to preserve one of the last free-roaming American bison (buffalo) herds in the United States. The ranch was established in 1907 when 28 bison were moved from Fort Yellowstone to the Lamar Valley in the northeast corner of the park.

The herd at the Lamar Buffalo Ranch was maintained as a semi-domesticated source of additional bison to enhance the park's natural herd. As the ranched herd increased in size, it was released to the open range, where it interbred with the wild herd. After the ranched bison were successfully integrated, the ranch continued to be used to produce hay to feed wild bison in the winter until the 1950s. Because the winter feeding program maintained the herd at artificially high levels and distorted the distribution of bison in the park, it fell from favor as the National Park Service adopted wildlife management policies that attempted to interfere as little as possible with each species' natural ecology.

Today the Lamar Buffalo Ranch is maintained as an historic district comprising five buildings built in the early 20th century. The complex includes a ranger station built in 1915, a bunkhouse built in 1929, a residence which was moved from Soda Butte in 1938, a barn built in 1927, and a corral. The interior of the bunkhouse has since been remodeled and is currently used by the park's public stewardship institute, Yellowstone Forever (formerly the Yellowstone Association), which conducts classes and seminars there.

Notes

External links
 National Park Service video - Lamar Buffalo Ranch
Lamar Buffalo Ranch at the Wyoming State Historic Preservation Office

1907 establishments in Wyoming
Buildings and structures in Yellowstone National Park in Wyoming
Historic American Buildings Survey in Wyoming
Historic districts on the National Register of Historic Places in Wyoming
National Register of Historic Places in Park County, Wyoming
National Register of Historic Places in Yellowstone National Park
Ranches on the National Register of Historic Places in Wyoming
Rustic architecture in Wyoming